Bacillomycins are a group of antifungal polypeptide antibiotics isolated from Bacillus subtilis.

Examples include:
 Bacillomycin A (fungosin, structure unknown)
 Bacillomycin C (structure unknown)
 Bacillomycin D (C45H68N10O15)
 Bacillomycin F (C52H84N12O14)
 Bacillomycin Fc (C52H84N12O14)
 Bacillomycin L (Landy substance)
 Bacillomycin S (structure unknown)

References

Polypeptide antibiotics
Antifungals